Daraar ( Rift) is a 1996 Indian romantic psychological thriller film directed by Abbas-Mustan starring Juhi Chawla, Rishi Kapoor and Arbaaz Khan in his film debut. Khan received the Filmfare Best Villain Award for his portrayal as a possessive husband. Upon release, the film received mixed to positive reviews, especially for Arbaaz's portrayal as a possessive and abusive husband.

Synopsis
Vikram is an overly doubting and abusive husband. He can't control his anger and rage and he continuously beats his newly-wed wife, Priya. Even going to the point of murdering a doctor that treated Priya and was trying to help her mother. One day, Vikram and Priya go to celebrate her birthday on a boat. But the boat gets stuck in a storm and Priya escapes during the mayhem. Vikram thinks that she drowned underwater. Instead, she runs away to Shimla  by swimming back to shore.

There, she meets Raj Malhotra. He falls in love with her, but she always is getting so farther away from him. Later, when she gets sick of him following her, she asks her mother what she should do. Her mother asks her to reveal to him the truth about her marriage. Then it will be his choice to accept her or not. Priya writes him a letter about her past life. She asks Hari to give it to Raj. Hari misplaces the letter and gets someone to write a new one. Raj gets this other letter which contains nothing but a poem. When he finds out she is married, he leaves her. After Hari finds the original letter, he gives it to Raj. Raj falls in love with Priya again and decides to marry her.

One day, Vikram sees Priya's picture in the newspaper and finds out that she is alive. He cancels his ticket for Goa and goes to Shimla. In Shimla, he searches for her. On finding that she is getting married, he tries to kill Raj but fails. So he sends Raj to prison instead, by falsely accusing him of attempted murder. Later, he goes to Priya's house and kills her friend and attempts to kill Priya as well.

In the climax, Vikram gets into a fight with Raj after the latter proves his innocence, while Raj was trying to save Priya from being killed by Vikram. Raj drowns Vikram in a bathtub full of water. While Vikram supposedly dies, Raj and Priya ran to a nearby rail station. Vikram attacks them again and pushes Raj. There, Vikram's feet get stuck on a railway track as he was chasing Priya. Seeing this, Priya tries to save Vikram as a train is approaching them fast. She tells him to move and runs to save him. Seeing Priya's love for him despite his abusive behaviour, he pushes her away just before a train hits him saying "You are free".

Cast
Juhi Chawla as Priya Bhatia
Rishi Kapoor as Raj Malhotra
Arbaaz Khan as Vikram 
Prithvi as Dr. Sen
Sulbha Arya as Nirmala Bhatia
Sushma Seth as Mrs Malhotra
Johny Lever as Hari
Razak Khan as Bedang Lucknowi Shayar
Tiku Talsania as Police Inspector
Dinesh Hingoo as Maulana in a Bus
Shiva Rindani as Rony
Sheela Sharma as Asha
Dinyar Contractor as the real estate agency's manager

Songs 
Music was directed by Anu Malik, while the background score was directed by Sandeep Chowta.

Awards and nominations

42nd Filmfare Awards 
Nominated - Filmfare Award for Best Actress - Juhi Chawla
 Filmfare Award for Best Villain - Arbaaz Khan

References

External links
 

1996 films
1990s Hindi-language films
Films directed by Abbas–Mustan
Films scored by Anu Malik
Films about domestic violence
Indian remakes of American films
Indian psychological thriller films
Indian romantic drama films